Felicia Nicolette C. Gavron (nee Coates)
is a British politician who served as Deputy Mayor of London to Ken Livingstone from 2000 to 2003 and 2004 to 2008. She was a member of the London Assembly from 2000 to 2021 and was the former Labour candidate for the 2004 Mayor of London elections.

Biography 
Gavron was born in Worcester. She is the daughter of a German Jew who had fled Nazi Germany in 1936 as pressure on the Jewish community was mounting. In March 2008 she claimed that her mother was chosen to dance before Hitler in the opening ceremony of the 1936 Olympics, until the authorities discovered that she was Jewish.

She studied at Worcester Girls' Grammar School, followed by the study of the history of art at the Courtauld Institute in London. She then gained a job as a lecturer at the Camberwell School of Art in South London.

Political career 
Gavron first became interested in politics in the 1970s when she campaigned against the widening of the Archway Road in London.  In an interview with The Guardian she said, "It was in the days when everyone thought road widening was the answer, but the penny dropped for me that it was part of the problem."

In 1986, following the abolition of the Greater London Council, she was elected as a Labour councillor for Archway ward in the London Borough of Haringey.  She was leader of the London Planning Advisory Committee from 1994 until it was absorbed into the Greater London Authority. She was elected London Assembly Member for Enfield and Haringey in the 2000 London Assembly election and was Deputy Mayor of London from May 2000 until June 2003, when the mayor, Ken Livingstone, appointed Jenny Jones, of the Green Party, to succeed her.

Although she was selected as Labour's mayoral candidate for the 2004 elections, she stepped aside when Ken Livingstone was readmitted to the party. In the 2004 London Assembly election she was re-elected as a London-wide Labour Assembly Member on the party list. Shortly after the election, Livingstone once again appointed her to the position of deputy mayor. Gavron was supposed to take up a position as acting mayor during Livingstone's suspension for four weeks from 1 March 2006, but a High Court order froze the suspension, allowing Livingstone to remain in office.

Gavron stood for the Barnet and Camden London Assembly seat in the 2008 GLA elections against the Conservative incumbent, Brian Coleman. Although she was unsuccessful in this contest she increased the Labour share of the vote in the constituency and was re-elected to the Assembly on the London-wide list vote.

Gavron ceased to be Deputy Mayor on 4 May 2008 following Boris Johnson's victory in the 2008 London mayoral election. She subsequently served as chair of the London Assembly's Housing and Planning Committee, and as a Deputy Chair of the Planning Committee. She also served as the London Assembly Labour Group's lead spokesperson on planning matters.

Gavron is a former member of the Safer London Committee and the Metropolitan Police Authority. She also served on the Mayor's Advisory Cabinet, holding the portfolio for spatial development and strategic planning. In this capacity she was the driving force behind much of the Mayor's environment and planning policy, overseeing the London Plan.

In January 2019, Gavron announced her intention to stand down at the 2020 London Assembly election.

Environmental policy 
Gavron is internationally recognised for her environmental expertise. She was a key figure in the establishment of the London Climate Change Agency and the C40 – a worldwide climate change action group made up of the world's largest cities. In 2006, Business Week Magazine cited her, along with Ken Livingstone, as one of the twenty most important people in the world in the battle against greenhouse gas emissions.  The magazine said that "[She aims] to turn London into a model of a sustainable future for all the world's great cities."

In the same year she called for a new Clean Air Act – a Low Carbon Act to fight climate change. She envisioned low carbon zones being rolled out across the country in the same way that smokeless zones were in the 1950s.

Gavron has criticised patio heaters, calling them "an indulgence too far". In an article for the Guardian'''s Comment is Free'' site she asked, "Why not wear a jumper and enjoy fresh air, not a cocktail of carbon dioxide, carbon monoxide and goodness knows what else."

Personal life
In 1967 she married the publishing tycoon Robert Gavron (later Lord Gavron), a widower with two children. They had two daughters together, Jessica, now a lawyer, and Sarah, a film director. They divorced in 1987.

References

External links 

Biography from the London Assembly
Met Police Authority profile
Passnotes from the Guardian

1941 births
Living people
Politicians from Worcester, England
British Ashkenazi Jews
English Jews
Alumni of the Courtauld Institute of Art
English people of German-Jewish descent
Councillors in the London Borough of Haringey
Labour Co-operative Members of the London Assembly
Nicky Gavron
Jewish British politicians
Spouses of life peers
Women councillors in England